Formic anhydride, also called methanoic anhydride, is an organic compound with the chemical formula   and a structural formula of (H(C=O)−)2O.  It can be viewed as the anhydride of formic acid (HCOOH).

Preparation
Formic anhydride can be obtained by reaction of formyl fluoride with excess sodium formate and a catalytic amount of formic acid in ether at −78 °C.  It can also be produced by reacting formic acid with N,N′-dicyclohexylcarbodiimide ((−N=)2C) in ether at −10 °C.  It can also be obtained by disproportionation of acetic formic anhydride.

Properties 
Formic anhydride is a liquid with boiling point 24 °C at 20 mmHg.  It is stable in diethyl ether solution.  It can be isolated by low-temperature, low-pressure distillation, but decomposes on heating above room temperature. At room temperature and higher, it decomposes through a decarbonylation reaction into formic acid and carbon monoxide.  Due to its instability, formic anhydride is not commercially available and must be prepared fresh and used promptly.

The decomposition of formic anhydride may be catalyzed by formic acid.

Formic anhydride can be detected in the gas-phase reaction of ozone with ethylene.  The molecule is planar in the gas phase.

See also
 Acetic formic anhydride
 Acetic anhydride
 Formaldehyde

References

Carboxylic anhydrides